Ian Charles Watmore (born 5 July 1958) is a British management consultant and former senior civil servant under three prime ministers, serving from October 2016 as the First Civil Service Commissioner.

Early life and business career 
Born in Croydon, Surrey, he was educated at the Trinity School of John Whitgift and then graduated with a degree in mathematics and management studies from Trinity College, Cambridge. He trained as an management consultant with Andersen Consulting, and ultimately became Accenture's managing director for the United Kingdom from 2000 to 2004.

This career involved IT and consulting in the private sector, and involved him joining the board of e-skills UK, the Sector Skills Council for IT, from 2000 until 2006, and serving as the president of the Management Consultants Association from 2003 to 2004.

Government career 
Watmore joined the civil service of the United Kingdom as the first Government Chief Information Officer (GCIO), taking over as head of the e-Government Unit, the direct successor to the Office of the e-Envoy in September 2004. Fifteen months later, at the end of 2005, the Cabinet Office announced that Watmore was that next month to succeed his boss Sir Michael Barber, as the second ever head of the Prime Minister's Delivery Unit, reporting directly to the Prime Minister and the Cabinet Secretary.

Formally the "Chief Advisor to Prime Minister on Delivery", Watmore appointed John Suffolk, the Director General of Criminal Justice IT as his replacement GCIO in May, and Andrew Stott as his deputy on the GCTO side. In June 2007, following the reshuffle when Gordon Brown became Prime Minister, Watmore was appointed as the inaugural Permanent Secretary of the new Department for Innovation, Universities and Skills, working for the Secretary of State John Denham.

Eighteen months later, it was announced that Watmore would leave the Civil Service to be the new Chief Executive of The Football Association, succeeding Brian Barwick starting the job in June 2009. He resigned from this post nine months later, on 19 March 2010, and was replaced by Alex Horne, initially in an acting capacity and later as General Secretary.

Three months later, following the General Election, Watmore returned to government as the Chief Operating Officer of the Cabinet Office, heading up the newly formed Efficiency and Reform Group.

Sixteen months after that, on 11 October 2011 it was announced that Watmore would become Permanent Secretary to the Cabinet Office, replacing Sir (now Lord) Gus O'Donnell, whose three roles were split after his retirement at the end of 2011. However, he only held this role for six months, announcing in May 2012 that he was resigning to spend more time with his family. He was replaced by Richard Heaton.

In September 2016, it was announced that Watmore would succeed Sir David Normington as the independent First Civil Service Commissioner regulator of the Civil Service from 1 October 2016. for a non renewable five year term.

Other roles 
Watmore was a member of the advisory board of Westminster Business School from 2010 to 2013, and has been a board member of the Information Commissioner's Office since 2012. He has been a trustee of the Migraine Trust since 2008, serving as its Chair since 2010. Watmore has been a Church Commissioner since 2014, and his wife is a priest in the Church of England in the Diocese of Chester.

Watmore is a lifelong supporter of Arsenal, and has had several sport related appointments. He has been a board member of the English Institute of Sport since 2002, and in March 2012, he joined the England Rugby 2015 board. He is the non executive chair of Quantum Sport, a sports agency which represents his son, Duncan, who is a professional footballer. He had been chair of the England and Wales Cricket Board since 1 September 2020. On 7 October 2021, he stepped down as ECB Chairman with immediate effect, after serving only 13 months of his five-year term.

References

Offices held 

1958 births
Living people
People educated at Trinity School of John Whitgift
Alumni of Trinity College, Cambridge
People from Croydon
Permanent Under-Secretaries of State for Innovation, Universities and Skills
Civil servants in the Cabinet Office
Chief executives of the Football Association
Internet in the United Kingdom
Chief operating officers